Mynydd Marchywel is a  high hill in the Neath Port Talbot area in South Wales. Its summit is marked both by a cairn and a trig point. The larger part of the hill is cloaked in modern forestry through which numerous streams fall away westward to the  River Tawe, eastward to the River Dulais and southward into the Clydach, the latter two being tributaries of the River Neath.

Geology 
The hill is formed from multiple layers of Pennant Sandstone with intervening mudstone layers and occasional coal seams. All are tilted to the south and southwest towards the axis of the South Wales Coalfield syncline. Parts of its slopes are mantled by glacial till. The coal seams have been worked extensively in the past. One of the last operations was that at Gleision Colliery under the northwestern side of Mynydd Marchywel.

Scheduled monuments
The heap of stones, now gradually spreading, has traces of kerbstones amongst the rubble.

Tirlan medieval house sites (OS grid ref:SN762026). Cultivation ridges are also in the vicinity.

Access 
Mynydd Marchywel is crossed by Saint Illtyd's Walk which locally runs from Ynysmeudwy to Crynant across the northern slopes of the hill, following one of the very few public rights of way to be found on the hill. There are however numerous forest tracks and most of its western flanks, including the summit area, are designated as open access under the Countryside and Rights of Way Act 2000.

See also
List of Scheduled Monuments in Neath Port Talbot

References

External links 
 images of Mynydd Marchywel and area on Geograph website

Mountains and hills of Neath Port Talbot
Marilyns of Wales